The Cecil Williams South Carolina Civil Rights Museum is a museum in Orangeburg, South Carolina commemorating the civil rights movement. The curator of the museum is photographer Cecil J. Williams.

Collection and background 
The museum holds thirty-five historical exhibits consisting of 500 photographs and over 200 artifacts concerning the civil rights movement in South Carolina during the 1950s and 1960s. The exhibits focus of major events, such as the Briggs v. Elliott Supreme Court case, the Orangeburg Freedom Movement, Harvey Gantt admission to Clemson University, the Orangeburg Massacre, and the 1969 Charleston hospital strike.

The museum also offers other attractions, including a civil rights movement timeline, an 800-name recognition wall, a digitization laboratory, a sign-in wall, media and presentation center, community meeting room, library, and gift shop.

The 3,500-square-foot museum opened in 2019. It is located in a building Williams designed in 1986.

Initially, Williams funded the museum himself until it generated interests from visitors and attracted regional and national grants. In 2020, the museum was featured on national television, and National Geographic. He received a $100,000 donation for the museum a few months after its opening.

References 

Civil rights movement museums
History museums in South Carolina
2019 establishments in South Carolina
Museums established in 2019
Museums in Orangeburg County, South Carolina